Mavi may refer to:

People
 Mavi (rapper) (Omavi Minder, born 1999), an American rapper
Shivam Mavi (born 1998), an Indian cricketer

Places
Mavi, East Azerbaijan, a village in East Azerbaijan Province, Iran
Mavi, Razavi Khorasan, a village in Razavi Khorasan Province, Iran
Mavi, Hamadan, a village in Hamadan Province, Iran
Mavi-ye Olya, a village in Khuzestan Province, Iran
Mavi-ye Sofla, a village in Khuzestan Province, Iran
Shahrak-e Mavi, a village in Khuzestan Province, Iran

Other uses
 Maví or Maybe, a tree bark-based beverage
 Mavi (jeans), a Turkish clothing company ("Mavi" meaning "blue" in Turkish)
 A Jatt clan in the Punjab region of India and Pakistan; see Nayagaon, Punjab